The following highways are numbered 5B:

United States
  Nevada State Route 5B (former)
  New York State Route 5B
  Oklahoma State Highway 5B

See also
 List of highways numbered 5